The Women's 200 metre backstroke competition at the 2019 World Championships was held on 26 and 27 July 2019.

Records
Prior to the competition, the existing world and championship records were as follows.

The following new records were set during this competition.

Results

Heats
The heats were held on 26 July at 10:23.

Semifinals
The semifinals were held on 26 July at 20:20.

Semifinal 1

Semifinal 2

Final
The final was started on 27 July at 20:58.

References

Women's 200 metre backstroke
2019 in women's swimming